P33, P-33 or P.33 may refer to:

Vessels 
 , a corvette of the Argentine Navy
 , a patrol boat of the Ghana Navy
 , a P-class sloop of the Royal Navy
 , a submarine of the Royal Navy
 , a corvette of the Indian Navy

Other uses 
 Boulton & Paul P.33 Partridge, a British prototype fighter aircraft
 Cochise County Airport, in Cochise County, Arizona, United States
 Consolidated XP-33, an American prototype fighter aircraft
 Papyrus 33, a biblical manuscript
 Phosphorus-33, a radioactive isotope of phosphorus
 P33, a state regional road in Latvia